Turku Music Festival is the oldest continuously operating music festival in Finland. The festival was founded in 1960 by the Musical Society in Turku. The city festival offers audiences' big orchestral concerts, chamber music concerts, recitals, jazz, out-door events and concerts. The festival is annually visited by both international and Finnish artists.

The festival takes place in several concert halls, churches and other venues in Turku such as the Turku Concert Hall, the Academy Hall, the Turku Cathedral, Sigyn Hall, the Turku Castle and the Sibelius Museum.

The program consists of orchestral concerts by Turku's own philharmonic orchestra as well as several visiting ensembles and conductors, soloists, chamber musicians, jazz musicians and also several staged or semi-staged music performances.

From 2019 the festival's artistic director will be conductor and cellist Klaus Mäkelä. Previous artistic directors have been pianist/conductor Ville Matvejeff, tenor Topi Lehtipuu, pianist/conductor Olli Mustonen and cellist Martti Rousi.

Artists who have visited the festival 
Violin: Lisa Batiashvili, Joshua Bell, Igor Oistrakh, Gidon Kremer, Anne-Sophie Mutter
Cello: Steven Isserlis, Heinrich Schiff, Arto Noras, Natalia Gutman
Song: Sonya Yoncheva, Elina Garanca, Natalie Dessay, Jorma Hynninen, Soile Isokoski, Jonas Kaufmann, Karita Mattila, Matti Salminen, Elisabeth Schwarzkopf, Rolando Villazón
Piano: Emil Gilels, Claudio Arrau, Grigory Sokolov, Rodion Shchedrin, Andras Schiff, Olli Mustonen, Murray Perahia, Svjatoslav Richter, Yefim Bronfman, Vladimir Ashkenazy, Lang Lang, Bella Davidovich, Jonathan Biss
Conductors: Paavo Järvi, Daniel Harding, Valeri Gergiev, Rene Jacobs, Yevgeny Mravinsky, Yuri Temirkanov, Sergiu Celibidache, Esa-Pekka Salonen, Yehudi Menuhin, Vladimir Ashkenazy, Mikhail Pletnev, Sakari Oramo, Myung-Whun Chung
Orchestras: St. Petersburg Philharmonic Orchestra, Mariinsky Theatre Orchestra, London Philharmonia Orchestra, The Finnish Radio Symphony Orchestra, The Swedish Radio Symphony Orchestra, Seoul Philharmonic Orchestra
String-quartets: Lindsay String Quartet, Borodin Quartet, Chilingirian Quartet, Meta4
Early Music: Emmanuelle Haïm, Jordi Savall, Gustav Leonhardt, Ton Koopman, Le Concert d'Astrée, Helsinki Baroque Orchestra, Il pomo d'oro
Rock: Apocalyptica
Other guests: Donna Leon, John Malkovich

External links 
Official website of the Turku Music Festival

Music festivals in Finland
Culture in Turku
Recurring events established in 1960
Tourist attractions in Turku
Music festivals established in 1960